The Deputy Chief of the Air Staff (DCAS) is a senior appointment in the Indian Air Force. The DCAS is a PSO (Principal Staff Officer) at Air Force Headquarters in New Delhi. The office is held by a Three Star Officer in the rank of Air Marshal. The current DCAS is Air Marshal Narmdeshwar Tiwari who took over from Air Marshal Suraj Kumar Jha on 1 October 2021.

History
At the time of independence of India on 15 August 1947, Air Commodore Subroto Mukerjee was appointed Deputy Air Commander, Royal Indian Air Force, in addition to being Senior Air Staff Officer (SASO) at the newly-formed Air HQ. On 15 November the same year, he was promoted to the acting rank of Air Vice Marshal. In 1949, the RIAF was reorganised and the post was re-designated Deputy Chief of the Air Staff (DCAS). The DCAS continued to be the Deputy Air Commander. On 1 January 1963, the post of Vice Chief of the Air Staff was created and became the second-highest post of the Indian Air Force. In 1968, the post was upgraded to three-star rank Air Marshal.

Order of precedence
The DCAS ranks at No. 24 on the Indian order of precedence, along with Lieutenant Generals of the Indian Army and Vice Admirals of the Indian Navy. The DCAS is in the HAG+ pay scale (pay level 16), and draws salary depending on the years in service. However, since they should not draw equivalent or more than the next higher level, the remuneration is capped at ₹224,000.

Appointees

** Went on to become Chief of the Air Staff

See also
 Chief of the Air Staff
 Vice Chief of the Air Staff
 Deputy Chief of the Army Staff
 Deputy Chief of the Navy Staff

Notes

References

Indian military appointments